The Kanab Library is a historic building in Kanab, Utah. It was built by Mark E. Pope in 1939-1940 as a Works Progress Administration project to house the public library initially established in 1915, and designed in the Prairie School and Art Deco styles by architect Carson Fordham Wells, Jr. It has been listed on the National Register of Historic Places since September 7, 1995.

References

Art Deco architecture in Utah
Library buildings completed in 1939
Libraries on the National Register of Historic Places in Utah
National Register of Historic Places in Kane County, Utah
Prairie School architecture in Utah
Works Progress Administration in Utah
1939 establishments in Utah